Bucoșnița is a commune in Caraș-Severin County, western Romania, with a population of 3,125 people. It is composed of four villages: Bucoșnița, Goleț (Galacs), Petroșnița (Petresfalva) and Vălișoara (Temesvölgye). It is situated in the historical region of Banat.

References

Communes in Caraș-Severin County
Localities in Romanian Banat
Place names of Slavic origin in Romania